Diamond Duet is the ninth collaborative studio album by Conway Twitty and Loretta Lynn. It was released on October 22, 1979, by MCA Records.

Critical reception
In the November 17, 1979 issue, Billboards review said, "This is the popular country duo's tenth anniversary of making records together. hence the title, Diamond Duet. With a selection of contemporary and standard songs, the duo score with Randy Goodrum's "True Love" and Mac Davis' "Baby Don't Get Hooked On Me". Also contained is a rousing version of "Hit the Road Jack" and Hank Cochran's "That's All That Matters". The album contains two Foster Rice titles including the new single "You Know lust What I'd Do" and "Rising Above It All". Overall, the production is sparkling throughout the album, with an excellent choice of material. Twitty and Lynn should make records for another ten years."

Cashbox published a review in the November 3, 1979 issue which said, "This album celebrates ten years worth of duets from Conway and Loretta and they present a gem of an album. The songs are all well selected and balanced showing the duo stretching out from their traditional hard country sound. Best cuts are "What's a Little Love Between Friends", "The Sadness of It All", "That's All That Matters" and "Rising Above It All." This duet continues to come on strong."

 Commercial performance 
The album peaked at No. 22 on the US Billboard Hot Country LP's chart, becoming the duo's lowest charting album at the time.

The album's first single, "You Know Just What I'd Do", was released in October 1979 peaked at No. 9 on the US Billboard Hot Country Singles chart. In Canada, it peaked at No. 5 on the RPM Country Singles chart, marking the duo's ninth single to peak in the top 10 in both countries. The second single, "It's True Love", was released in April 1980 peaked at No. 5 in the US and No. 2 in Canada, marking the duo's tenth top ten hit in both countries.

 Track listing 

 Personnel 
Adapted from the album liner notes.

David Barnes – Arrangements
Danny Hilley – Engineer
David McKinley – Engineer
Conway Twitty – Producer
David Barnes – Producer
Loretta Lynn – Producer
Denny Purcell – MasteringMusicians:'
Johnny Christopher – acoustic guitar
Mike Leech – bass
Jerry Carrigan – drums
Cindy Reynolds – harp
Bobby Wood – keyboards
Reggie Young – lead guitar
Jerry Carrigan – percussion
John Hughey – steel guitar
The Sheldon Kurland Strings - strings
Dennis Solee – woodwinds
Duane West, Janie Fricke, Lea Jane Berinati, Tom Brannon - backing vocals

Charts

Album

Singles

References 

1980 albums
Loretta Lynn albums
Conway Twitty albums
MCA Records albums